Puerto Rico Highway 54 (PR-54) is a short divided highway located in Guayama, Puerto Rico and is mainly a by-pass route from Puerto Rico Highway 3 out of Downtown Guayama to Puerto Rico Highway 53. The government of Puerto Rico named the stretch of highway that extends from PR-54, in Guayama, to PR-52, in Salinas Autopista José M. Dávila Monsanto in honor of the late Puerto Rican political leader José M. Dávila Monsanto.

Major intersections

See also

 List of highways numbered 54

References

External links

 

054
Guayama, Puerto Rico